Natasha Cayer is the Canadian Ambassador to the Organization for Security and Co-operation in Europe.  She has also served as deputy permanent delegate and chargé d'affaires at the Permanent Mission to UNESCO.

Education 
Cayer earned a bachelor of social science in political science from the University of Ottawa in 1992 and a master of arts in International Affairs from Carleton University in 1997.

Career 
Cayer joined Canada's Department of Foreign Affairs and International Trade in 1995. She has represented Canada to NATO, to international organisations based in Austria, in New York City and in Wellington, New Zealand.

In 2018, as Chechen leadership was accused of persecuting human rights defenders, Cayer announced that the Organization for Security and Co-operation in Europe would enforce its Vienna Mechanism against Russia.

As of 2020, Cayer was the Canadian Ambassador to the Organization for Security and Co-operation in Europe.  She has also served as deputy permanent delegate and chargé d'affaires at the Permanent Mission to UNESCO from 2007 until 2011 and took the Paris-based role again in 2020.

Personal life 
Cayer is married with two children.

References

Canadian women ambassadors
Permanent Representatives of Canada to the Organization for Security and Co-operation in Europe
Carleton University alumni
University of Ottawa alumni
Year of birth missing (living people)
Living people